Family Broadcasting Corporation, formerly known as LeSEA Broadcasting, is an American Christian television network. Founded by Lester Sumrall in 1972, Family Broadcasting Corporation is headquartered in South Bend, Indiana, and broadcasts Christian and family programming. Peter Sumrall, son of Lester Sumrall, served as its president and chief executive officer from 2002 to 2015. His son, Drew Sumrall, now serves in the same position.

National channels

World Harvest Television (WHT) 
World Harvest Television (WHT), channel 367 on DirecTV, focuses mostly on direct televangelism, carrying hosts such as Sid Roth, Joseph Prince, Joyce Meyer, and James Robison. Program time not filled by televangelists is filled with infomercials; WHT does air some limited entertainment programming, consisting mainly of a block with  The Real McCoys and the public-domain episodes of The Beverly Hillbillies in the afternoons, along with non-religious E/I programs and a few syndicated programs such as Sports Stars of Tomorrow and Today's Homeowner with Danny Lipford on Saturdays, along with Israeli Basketball Premier League games. WHT is available in over 21.2 million homes across the country on DirecTV, as well as on the Sky Angel Faith Package; a video stream of the channel is available on the Internet.

Family Entertainment Television (FETV) 

Family Entertainment Television (FETV), channel 323 on DirecTV, channel 82 on Dish Network, channel 245 on Verizon Fios, channel 578 on AT&T U-Verse, and Sling TV offers viewers a mix of religious and family-friendly programming. FETV provides such programming as Perry Mason, Matlock, the Lone Ranger, Hazel, Bewitched, I Dream of Jeannie, The Flying Nun and The Roy Rogers Show, as well as a selection of televangelists in the morning time slots.

Family Movie Classics (FMC) 
Family Movie Classics (FMC) is an American cable and satellite television network owned by the Family Broadcasting Corporation. The network features classic movies. FMC launched on October 28, 2021 on Dish Network to 9 million subscribers. In 2022, streaming services Frndly TV and Philo added the movie service to their offerings.

FBC-owned TV stations

WHMB-TV 

Originally acquired by Family Broadcasting Corporation in 1972, WHMB-TV 40 is the longest, continually operated Christian television station in the United States. WHMB reaches the entire Indianapolis, Indiana television market covering over one million households.

WHME-TV 

On September 10, 1977, WHME-TV 46 South Bend came onto the airwaves with mostly religious programming, as well as some family programming. Today, WHME is Family Broadcasting Corporation's headquarters, housing a number of separate divisions. Its programming is a blend of religion, local sports, and family entertainment.

KWHE 

KWHE TV 14 covers the major population centers of Hilo, Maui, Kona, and Honolulu, with Christian and family programming. The station is carried on Oceanic Cable channel 11 and on Hawaiian Telcom channel 14.

Former television stations

KWHB 

Purchased by Family Broadcasting Corporation in 1985, KWHB 47 is the oldest Christian television station in Tulsa, Oklahoma. Today, KWHB can be viewed on over 84 cable stations in Oklahoma, serving a potential audience of over 1.5 million people. The station was sold to the Christian Television Network on February 20, 2020.

WHFT 

WHFT TV 45 Miami, Florida signed on in 1975, was acquired by LeSea in the summer of 1976, and was sold to Trinity Broadcasting Network in July 1980.

WHKE 

WHKE signed on June 1988 and was owned by LeSea. The station was sold to Paxson Communications in 1995, being a temporary affiliate of the paid programming network inTV before the August 1998 launch of PAX TV, today's Ion Television.

WHNO 

WHNO TV 20 New Orleans signed on October 1994. The station was sold to the Christian Television Network in April 2018.

WCVI-TV 

WCVI-TV 23 was acquired in 2014, and it is the Family Broadcasting Corporation station in the U.S. Virgin Islands. The station was sold to Lilly Broadcasting in 2020.

METV 

Middle East Television was acquired from CBN in July 2001. It is located in Limassol, Cyprus, and broadcasts to all of Western Asia. The station was sold to Sid Roth's Messianic Vision, Inc, in September 2016.

Radio

Shortwave 
Since 1985 Family Broadcasting Corporation has operated World Harvest Radio International (WHRI), designed to reach the over 200 million shortwave radio receivers in the world. Family Broadcasting Corporation is the only Christian broadcaster currently operating a global network of shortwave radio transmitters. Transmitter facilities are located in South Carolina and in Palau, Oceania (T8WH). Six transmitters are in operation full-time, named the Six Angels.

 Angel 1—Covers Africa, North America, Central America, South America, and Australia
 Angel 2—Covers parts of North America, Europe, and parts of Asia
 Angel 3—Covers Asia (T8WH)
 Angel 4—Covers Australia (T8WH)
 Angel 5—Covers Africa
 Angel 6—Covers North and Central America

In August 2020, it was announced that WHRI was selling its facilities to Allen Weiner, owner of Monticello, Maine-based shortwave station WBCQ, pending FCC approval.

FBC-owned FM radio stations

Harvest FM 
Harvest 103.1 FM, or WHME (FM), began broadcasting in 1968. The radio station, which serves the South Bend, Indiana, area, features a mix of interactive talk, Bible teaching programs, and inspirational music 24 hours a day.

Pulse FM 
Founded in 1996, Pulse FM WHPZ 96.9 broadcasts contemporary Christian music to the Michiana market. In December 2004, Family Broadcasting Corporation purchased WDOW 92.1 FM to increase Pulse FM's listening base, and the call letters are now WHPD 92.1. For many years, the radio station hosted World Pulse Festival, a one-day Christian music festival. In 2017, Pulse FM transitioned to a new concert format named Pulse Summer Series, a series of three summer concerts in downtown South Bend, Indiana, at the Morris Performing Arts Center.

References

External links

Family Entertainment Television

Television networks in the United States
Christian mass media in the United States
Christian television stations
Religious television stations in the United States